McMurdo Sound is a sound in Antarctica.

Captain James Clark Ross discovered the sound in February 1841, and named it after one of Lieutenants of his ships Lt. Archibald McMurdo of HMS Terror  abandoned in 1845 and found again in 2016. The sound today serves as a resupply route for cargo ships and for airplanes that land on the floating ice airstrips near McMurdo Station.

Physical characteristics 
Wildlife in the sound include killer whales, seals, Adélie penguins, and emperor penguins.

Boundary and Extents 
The sound extends approximately 55 kilometers (34 mi) in length and width, and opens into the larger Ross Sea to the north. To the south, the sound is bounded by the Ross Ice Shelf cavity, to the west lies the Royal Society Range, and to the east is Ross Island.  McMurdo Sound is separated from the McMurdo Ice Shelf (itself part of the Ross Ice Shelf) by the Haskell Strait. Winter Quarters Bay lies at the south end of the Sound, and is the southernmost port in the world.

Navigability 
While the sound is navigable, it contains a significant amount of Drift ice, or pack ice, especially along the shoreline of Winter Quarters Bay. The pack ice that girdles the shoreline at Winter Quarters Bay and elsewhere in the sound presents a formidable obstacle to surface ships. Vessels require ice-strengthened hulls and often have to rely upon escort by icebreakers. 

Less than 10 percent of McMurdo Sound's shoreline is free of ice. 

McMurdo Sound during austral winter presents a virtually impenetrable expanse of surface ice. Even during summer, ships approaching McMurdo Sound are often blocked by various concentrations of first-year ice, fast ice (connected to the shoreline), and hard multi-year ice. Subsequently, icebreakers are required for maritime resupply missions to McMurdo Station. 

Ross Island is the southernmost piece of land in Antarctica that is accessible by ship. In addition, the harbor at McMurdo's Winter Quarters Bay is the world's southernmost seaport (Department of Geography, Texas A&M University). The access by ships depends upon favorable ice conditions.

Tourism is increasingly popular in other parts of Antarctica, but remains limited in McMurdo sound due to the extreme sea conditions.

Temperatures 
Cold circumpolar currents of the Southern Ocean reduce the flow of warm South Pacific or South Atlantic waters reaching McMurdo Sound and other Antarctic coastal waters. McMurdo Sound experiences katabatic winds spilling down from the Antarctic polar plateau. During the Antarctic summer when the pack ice breaks up, wind and currents may push the ice northward into the Ross Sea, stirring up cold bottom currents that spill into the ocean basins of the world.

Effects of wind 

Polar winds are a driving force behind weather systems arising from three surface zones that converge at McMurdo Sound: the polar plateau and Transantarctic Mountains, the Ross Ice Shelf, and the Ross Sea. These surface zones create a range of dynamic weather systems. These dry winds can reach hurricane force by the time they reach the Antarctic coast.

Prevailing winds spilling into McMurdo Sound shoot between mountain passes and other land formations, stirring up blizzards known locally as "Herbies". Such blizzards can occur any time of year. Residents of McMurdo Station and Scott Base have dubbed the nearby White Island and Black Island as Herbie Alley due to winds that funnel blizzards between the islands (Field Manual for the U.S. Antarctic Program).

Overall the continent's extreme cold air does not hold enough moisture for significant snowfall. The water equivalent from annual snowfall on Ross Island averages only . Snow seldom accumulates on the McMurdo Dry Valleys on the western shores of McMurdo Sound.

McMurdo Sound provides an important component in Antarctica's global effects upon climate. A key factor is the polar winds that can drive the sound's pack ice into the Ross Sea summer or winter. Frigid katabatic winds rake subsequent exposed water, causing sea ice to form. Freezing surface water excludes salt from the water below; leaving behind heavy, cold water that sinks to the ocean floor. This process repeats itself along Antarctica's coastal areas, spreading cold sea water outward into the world's ocean basins.

According to an interview with a climatologist Gerd Wendler, published in the National Science Foundation's Antarctic Sun, one could dive to the ocean floor anywhere in the world and encounter water from the coast of Antarctica. "Seventy five percent of all the bottom water, wherever you are, comes from Antarctica."

Temperatures
Average mean sea-level temp: 
Stormiest months: February and October
Source: U.S. National Science Foundation

Wildlife 

A rich sea life thrives under the barren expanse of McMurdo Sound's ice pack. Frigid waters that would kill many other fish in the world sustain the Antarctic notothenioids, a bony "ice fish" related to walleyes and perch. Bright yellow cactus sponges, green globe sponges, starfish, sea urchins, and sea anemones are also present. Large sea spiders inhabit the deeps of the sound and feed on sea anemone. Antarctic krill flourish in the upper depths the waters

Antarctic penguins, emperor penguins, and Adélie penguins live in and around the sound The Weddell seal, leopard seal, and crabeater seal have been spotted, as well as Orcas.

Strategic Importance
McMurdo Sound's role as a strategic waterway dates back to early 20th century Antarctic exploration. British explorers Ernest Shackleton and Robert Scott built bases on the sound's shoreline as jumping-off points for their overland expeditions to the South Pole.

McMurdo Sound's logistic importance continues today. Aircraft transporting cargo and passengers land upon frozen runways at Williams Field on the McMurdo Ice Shelf. Moreover, the annual sealift of a cargo ship and fuel tanker rely upon the sound as a supply route to the continent's largest base, the United States' McMurdo Station. Both the U.S. base and New Zealand's nearby Scott Base are on the southern tip of Ross Island.

Iceberg B-15A

A common event of previously unseen dimensions occurred on the Ross Ice Shelf in 2000 that wreaked havoc at McMurdo Sound more than five years later. Then, on 27 October 2005, B-15 suddenly broke up.

Wind and sea currents shifted a smaller, but still massive Iceberg B-15A towards McMurdo Sound. B-15A's enormous girth temporarily blocked the outflow of pack ice from McMurdo Sound, according to news reports.

Iceberg B-15A's grounding at the mouth of McMurdo Sound also blocked the path for thousands of penguins to reach their food source in open water. Moreover, pack ice built up behind the iceberg in the Ross Sea creating a nearly  frozen barrier that blocked two cargo ships en route to supply McMurdo Station, according to the National Science Foundation.

The last leg of the channel followed a route along the eastern shoreline of McMurdo Sound adjacent to Ross Island. The icebreakers escorted the tanker USNS Paul Buck to McMurdo Station's ice pier in late January. The freighter MV American Tern followed on 3 February.

Similar pack ice blocked a National Geographic expedition aboard the  Braveheart from reaching B-15A. However, expedition divers were able to explore the underwater world of another grounded tabular iceberg. They encountered a surprising environment of fish and other sea life secreted within a deep iceberg crevasse. Discoveries included starfish, crabs, and ice fish. The latter were found to have burrowed thumb-sized holes into the ice.

The expedition reported an exceedingly rare and seldom witnessed occurrence of an iceberg exploding. Shards of ice erupted into the air as if a bomb went off, this only hours after divers surfaced and after the Braveheart moved away from the iceberg (National Geographic).

Pollution
More than 50 years of continuous operation of the United States and New Zealand bases on Ross Island have left pockets of severe pollution in McMurdo Sound's. Until 1981, McMurdo Station residents simply towed their garbage out to the sea ice and let nature take its course. The garbage sank to the sea floor when the ice broke up in the spring, according to news reports.

Findings by scuba divers were reported in the State of the Environment Report, a New Zealand sponsored study.

The study by the government agency Antarctica New Zealand revealed that decades of daily pumping thousands of gallons of raw sewage from 1,200 summer residents into the sound had fouled Winter Quarters Bay, the harbor at McMurdo. The pollution ended in 2003 when a $5 million waste treatment plant went online. Other documented bay water contaminants include leakage from an open dump at the station. The dump introduced heavy metals, petroleum compounds, and chemicals into the water.

A study by the Australian Institute of Marine Science found that anti-fouling paints on the hulls of icebreakers are polluting McMurdo Sound. Such paints kill algae, barnacles, and other marine life that adhere to ship hulls. Scientists found that samples taken from the ocean floor contained high levels of tributyltin (TBT), a component of the anti-fouling paints. "The levels are close to the maximum, you will find anywhere, apart from ship grounding sites", said Andrew Negri of the institute.

Ships, aircraft, and land-based operations in McMurdo Sound all present hazards of oil spills or fuel leaks. For instance, in 2003, the build-up of two years of difficult ice conditions blocked the U.S. tanker MV Richard G. Matthiesen from reaching the harbor at McMurdo Station, despite the assistance of icebreakers. Instead shore workers rigged a temporary  fuel line over the ice pack to discharge the ship's cargo.

Officials balance the potential for fuel spills inherent in such operations against the critical need to keep McMurdo Station supplied with oil.

Zoologist Clive Evans from Auckland University described McMurdo's harbor as "one of the most polluted harbors in the world in terms of oil", according to a 2004 article by the New Zealand Herald.

Cleanup Efforts 
Modern operations in McMurdo Sound have sparked surface cleanup efforts, recycling, and exporting trash and other contaminants by ship. The U.S. National Science Foundation began a 5-year, $30-million cleanup program in 1989, according to Reuters News Agency. The concentrated effort targeted the open dump at McMurdo. By 2003, the U.S. Antarctic Program reported recycling approximately 70% of its wastes, according to Australia's Herald Sun.

The 1989 cleanup included workers testing hundreds of barrels at the dump site, mostly full of fuels and human waste, for identification before they are loaded onto a freighter for exportation. The precedent for exporting wastes began in 1971. The United States shipped out tons of radiation-contaminated soil after officials shut down a small nuclear power plant.

Tourism

Antarctica's extreme remoteness and hazardous travel conditions limit Antarctica tourism to an expensive niche industry largely centered on the Antarctic Peninsula. The number of seaborne tourists grew fourfold during the 1990s, reaching more than 14,000 by 2000, up from 2,500 ten years earlier. More than 46,000 airborne and seaborne tourists visited Antarctica during the 2007–2008 season, according to the International Association of Antarctic Tour Operators (IAATO).

This confederation of tour operators reports that only 5% of Antarctic tourists visit the Ross Sea area, which encompasses McMurdo Sound. Tourists congregate on the ice-free coastal zones during summer near the Antarctic Peninsula. The peninsula's wildlife, soaring mountains, and dramatic seascapes have drawn commercial visitors since the late 1950s, when Argentina and Chile operated cruises to the South Shetland Islands.

Tourists flights began in 1957, when a Pan American Boeing 377 Stratocruiser made the first civilian flight to Antarctica. Commercial flights landed at McMurdo Sound and the South Pole in the 1960s. Routine overflights from Australia and New Zealand took place between 1977 and 1980, transporting more than 11,000 passengers, according to Antarctica New Zealand, which manages Scott Base. One such flight, Air New Zealand Flight 901, crashed into Mount Erebus on the eastern shores of McMurdo Sound. The crash high on the slopes of the active volcano took the lives of all 257 people aboard the aircraft.

In 1969 the MS Explorer brought seagoing tourists to Antarctica (British Antarctic Survey). The cruise's founder, Lars-Eric Lindblad, coupled expeditionary cruising with education. He is quoted as saying, "You can't protect what you don't know" (IAATO). In the decades since then, ships engaged in Antarctic sightseeing cruises have grown in size and number.

Infrequent Antarctic cruises have included passenger vessels carrying up to 960 tourists (IAATO). Such vessels may conduct so-called "drive-by" cruises, with no landings made ashore.

The Russian Kapitan Khlebnikov has conducted voyages to the Weddell Sea and Ross Sea regions since 1992. High-latitude cruises in dense pack ice are only achievable during the summer season, November into March. In 1997, the vessel Kapitan Khlebnikov claimed the distinction of being the first ship to circumnavigate Antarctica with passengers (Quark Expeditions). Passengers aboard the icebreaker make landings aboard Zodiac inflatable boats to explore remote beaches. Their itinerary may also include stops at Ross Island's historic explorer huts at Discovery Point near McMurdo Station or Cape Royds (Antarctica New Zealand). Additionally, the Russian icebreaker extends the reach of tourism by launching helicopter trips from its decks, including visits to sites such as the McMurdo Dry Valleys and areas noted for wildlife viewing.

The 'Spirit of Enderby has been conducting cruises to the Ross Sea region for many years, including McMurdo Sound. Although the Enderby has an ice-strengthened hull, the ship is not an icebreaker. The Enderby sports Zodiac inflatable boats, a hovercraft for Antarctica voyages, and all-terrain vehicles for over ice or overland travel. Land-based tourism in Antarctica, however, continues to be rare. Antarctica lacks a permanent land-based tourism facility, despite the annual surge in the number of visitors.

The International Association of Tour Operators (IAATO) has established voluntary standards to discourage tourists from disrupting wildlife. Nonetheless, large ships, carrying more than 400 passengers, may spend up to 12 hours transporting tourists to and from breeding sites. Such large-ship operations expose wildlife to humans far longer than smaller vessels.

Prominent features

 Beaufort Island – This small island at the northern entrance to McMurdo Sound is a protected area due to its site as a penguin rookery.
An unmanned telecommunications base is here.
 Cape Royds – This is a protected area with the most southerly Adélie penguin colony (Antarctica New Zealand). The site features an expedition hut built by Ernest Shackleton and his crew of the Nimrod in 1907 on western shore of Ross Island.
 Discovery Point – Also called Hut Point, this location overlooking Winter Quarters Bay is the site of the expedition hut built by the British Antarctic Expedition(1901–04) led by Robert Falcon Scott.
Ice flowing rapidly from the glacier at the base of Mount Erebus forms the ice structure. MacKay Glacier Tongue is across the sound to the northwest at Granite Harbor.
 McMurdo Dry Valleys – This row of valleys on the western shore are so named because of their extremely low humidity and their lack of snow or ice cover.
 McMurdo Ice Shelf – This floating ice shelf forms the southern boundary of McMurdo Sound and is itself part of the larger Ross Ice Shelf.
 Mount Discovery – This isolated volcanic cone on the western shore of McMurdo Sound reaches  in height.
 Mount Erebus – This mountain is the southernmost active volcano on Earth. (Antarctic Connection). The mountain reaches  in height and is on Ross Island.
 Ross Island – This island features four principal volcanoes: Mount Erebus, Mount Terror, Mount Bird, and Mount Terra Nova. The United States and New Zealand scientific bases are on the southern end of the island.
 Royal Society Range – This volcanic range is part of the Transantarctic Mountains, one of the world's longest mountain chains (Antarctic Connection). The Royal Society Range is on McMurdo Sound's southwestern shore.
 White Island – The McMurdo Ice Shelf encircles White Island, which is visible from Scott Base. A perennial tidal crack in the ice permits Weddell seals to live at the island year round. (Texas A&M University at Galveston LABB)

Gallery

See also
Erebus Ice Tongue
Marble Point
McMurdo Station
Ross Sea
Scott Base
Williams Field
Winter Quarters Bay
Sea ice
Iceberg

Notes

References

A Special Place, Australian Government Antarctic Division.
Antarctic Connection.
Antarctica New Zealand Information Sheet.
Antarctic Climate & Ecosystems: Cooperative Research Center
The Aster Project.
British Antarctic Survey.
Clarke, Peter; On the Ice, Rand McNally & Company 1966.
Evolution of antifreeze glycoprotein gene from a trypsinogen gene in Antarctic notothenioid fish, Proceedings of the National Academy of Sciences of the United States December 2006.
Field Manual for the U.S. Antarctic Program.
First Ever Voyages, Quark Expeditions.
Fresh Fish, Not Frozen, Origins: Antarctica. Scientific Journeys from McMurdo to the Pole.
Frozen continent: Time to clean up the ice, New Zealand Herald. January 6, 2004.
Historical Development of McMurdo Station, Antarctica, an Environmental Perspective, Department of Geography, Texas A&M University; Geochemical and Environmental Research Group, Texas A&M; Uniondale High School, Uniondale New York.
Ice Bomb Goes Off. National Geographic.
Icebreakers Clear Channel into McMurdo Station. February 3, 2005.
International Association of Antarctica Tour Operations (IAAT0).
Laboratory for Applied Biotelemetry & Biotechnology.
Management Plan for Antarctic Specially Protected Area (ASPA) No. 121. Antarctica New Zealand.
MCMURDO DRY VALLEYS REGION, TRANSANTARCTIC MOUNTAINS, National Science Foundation
McMurdo Station Weather (USA Today).
NASA's Earth Observatory.
NewsRx.com
National Public Radio
Paint polluting Antarctic, Herald Sun; Melbourne, Australia. May 21, 2004.
Runaway Iceberg, Reed Business Information, UK; April 16, 2005.
U.S., Russian icebreakers open path to Antarctic base. USA Today; February 6, 2005.
The Guardian
U.S. Antarctic Base at McMurdo Sound a Dump, Reuters News Agency. December 29, 1991.
Understanding polar weather, USA Today. May 20, 2005.
Underwater Field Guide to Ross Island & McMurdo Sound.
U.S. Antarctic Program.
Where the Wind Blows, Anatarctic Sun. January 28, 2001.
Why is Antarctica so cold?, Antarctic Connection.

Further reading

External links
Antarctica New Zealand.
Antarctic Photo Library.
Antarctic Sun.
Australian Government Antarctic Division.
British Antarctic Survey.
International Association of Antarctic Tour Operators.
International Ice Patrol Student Section.
National Science Foundation.
New Zealand Antarctic Heritage Trust.

Sounds of Antarctica
Bodies of water of the Ross Dependency